The 2023 Faroe Islands Premier League will be the 81st  of top-tier football in the Faroe Islands, and the 18th under the current format.

KÍ are the defending champions, having won their 20th Faroese title in the previous season.

Teams
ÍF joined as the promoted clubs from the 2022 1. deild. They replaced Skála who were relegated to the 2023 1. deild.

League table

Fixtures and results
Each team plays three times (either twice at home and once away or once at home and twice away) against each other team for a total of 27 matches each.

Rounds 1–18

Rounds 19–27

Top scorers

References

External links

 Official website

Faroe Islands Premier League seasons
1
Faroe
Faroe